Parthasarathy Harishchandra Sharma  (5 January 1948 – 20 October 2010) was an Indian cricketer.

Sharma was born in Alwar, Rajasthan and played in five Test matches and two One Day Internationals from 1974 to 1977. He played first-class cricket for Rajasthan in the Ranji Trophy from 1962 to 1963 (when he made his debut a few days before his 15th birthday) to 1984–85. In the beginning of his career he kept wickets too, but later gave up keeping and became an off spinner. He was a master of playing spin bowling and people compared him to Vijay Manjrekar the way he handled the turning ball.

In 1977–78 he captained Rest of India to an innings victory over Bombay in the Irani Cup, scoring 206, his highest score, and taking four wickets. His best bowling figures came against Vidarbha in 1974–75, when he took the first six wickets in the second innings to finish with 6 for 26, then hit the highest score of the match, 54 not out, to give Rajasthan victory by eight wickets.

References

External links
 
 "Parthasarathy Sharma: A talented all-rounder" by Abhishek Mukherjee

1948 births
2010 deaths
India Test cricketers
India One Day International cricketers
Indian cricketers
Rajasthan cricketers
Central Zone cricketers
Indian Universities cricketers
Indian Starlets cricketers
Rajasthani people
Deaths from cancer in India
Rajasthan cricket captains
People from Alwar
Cricketers from Rajasthan